Phragmacossia is a genus of moths in the family Cossidae.

Species
 Phragmacossia ariana (Grum-Grshimailo, 1899)
 Phragmacossia brahmana Yakovlev, 2009
 Phragmacossia dudgeoni (Arora, 1974)
 Phragmacossia fansipangi Yakovlev & Witt, 2009
 Phragmacossia furiosa (Sheljuzhko, 1943)
 Phragmacossia ihlei Yakovlev, 2008
 Phragmacossia kiplingi Yakovlev, 2011
 Phragmacossia libani Daniel in Zerni, 1933
 Phragmacossia laklong Yakovlev, 2014
 Phragmacossia micromaculata Yakovlev, 2009
 Phragmacossia minos Reisser, 1962
 Phragmacossia paghmana Daniel, 1963
 Phragmacossia territa (Staudinger, 1879)
 Phragmacossia tigrisia Schawerda, 1924
 Phragmacossia vartianae Daniel, 1963

References

 , 2009: New taxa of African and Asian Cossidae (Lepidoptera). Euroasian Entomological Journal 8 (3): 353-361. Full article: .
 , 2009: Little known species of Palaearctic and Oriental Cossidae (Lepidoptera). IV. Phragmacossia ariana (Grum-Grshimailo, 1899), comb. n. Amurian zoological journal I (1): 55. Full article: .
 , 2009: The Carpenter Moths (Lepidoptera:Cossidae) of Vietnam. Entomofauna Supplement 16: 11-32.

External links
Natural History Museum Lepidoptera generic names catalog

Zeuzerinae